The Rings is a 1985 Iranian horror mystery film written by director Mohsen Makhmalbaf and directed by Mohammad Reza Honarmand. It tells the story of a reporter investigating the sudden, inexplicable deaths of a growing number of people who had received phone calls informing them of exactly how long they had to live. The word Zangha is Persian for "The Rings" (as in telephone rings).

Plot
The citizens of an unnamed city are being terrorized by an extraordinary killer. The victims pick up a ringing phone and are told by a mysterious voice how long they have to live. Invariably, they all die in mysterious ways at the exact specified moment.

A reporter begins to investigate the phenomenon, but the more he investigates the deaths the more mysterious they seem. As he delves into more cases, he becomes personally involved and obsessed. Before long, he finds his family and finally himself targets of the elusive killer. The film ends with the reporter's death. The nature of who or what (if anything) caused the deaths is not resolved in the end, and the audience is left to decide on the film's narrative.

See also
 Cinema of Iran

External links
 

1980s Persian-language films
1985 films
1985 horror films
Iranian horror films